Paul Ghirardani is an American art director. He has won six Primetime Emmy Awards and been nominated for two more in the category Outstanding Production Design.

Selected television 
 Little Dorrit (2008; won)
 Into the Storm (2008; nominated)
 Great Expectations (2011)
 Game of Thrones (2013; won)
 Game of Thrones (2014; won)
 Game of Thrones (2015; won)
 Game of Thrones (2017; won)
 Game of Thrones (2018; nominated)

References

External links 

Living people
Place of birth missing (living people)
Year of birth missing (living people)
American art directors
Primetime Emmy Award winners